Christina Hammock Koch (born January 29, 1979) is an American engineer and NASA astronaut of the class of 2013. She received Bachelor of Science degrees in electrical engineering and physics and a Master of Science in electrical engineering at North Carolina State University. She also did advanced study while working at the Goddard Space Flight Center.  Just before becoming an astronaut, she served at the National Oceanic and Atmospheric Administration as station chief for American Samoa.

On March 14, 2019, Koch launched to the International Space Station as a Flight Engineer on Expedition 59, 60 and 61. On October 18, 2019, she and Jessica Meir were the first women to participate in an all-female spacewalk to replace a down power control unit located outside of the International Space Station. On December 28, 2019, Koch broke the record for longest continuous time in space by a woman. She returned from space on February 6, 2020.

Koch was included in Times 100 Most Influential People of 2020.

Early life and education
Christina was born in Grand Rapids, Michigan, and raised in Jacksonville, North Carolina, by parents Barbara Johnsen of Frederick, Maryland, and Ronald Hammock of Jacksonville. Koch's childhood dream was to become an astronaut.

Koch graduated from the North Carolina School of Science and Mathematics in Durham in 1997, and then enrolled at North Carolina State University in Raleigh, from which she earned two Bachelor of Science degrees, in electrical engineering and physics (2001), and a Master of Science degree in electrical engineering (2002). In 2001, she became a graduate of the NASA Academy program at the Goddard Space Flight Center.

Research and training 

Koch has worked in the space science instrument development and remote scientific field engineering fields. During her time working as an electrical engineer at NASA GSFC's Laboratory for High Energy Astrophysics, she contributed to scientific instruments on several NASA missions that studied astrophysics and cosmology. During this time, she also served as Adjunct Faculty at Montgomery College in Maryland and led a Physics Laboratory course.

Koch worked as a Research Associate in the United States Antarctic Program from 2004 to 2007, spending three-and-a-half years traveling the Arctic and Antarctic regions. She completed a winter-over season at the Amundsen–Scott South Pole Station where she experienced minus-111 degree Fahrenheit (-79.4 C) temperatures. She completed an additional season at Palmer Station. While in Antarctica, Koch served as a member of the Firefighting Teams and Ocean/Glacier Search and Rescue Teams. She has described her time in the South Pole as challenging mentally and physically: "[This] means going months without seeing the sun, with the same crew, and without shipments of mail or fresh food. The isolation, absence of family and friends, and lack of new sensory inputs are all conditions that you must find a strategy to thrive within."

From 2007 to 2009, Koch worked as an Electrical Engineer in the Space Department of the Applied Physics Laboratory at Johns Hopkins University focusing on space science instrument development. She contributed to instruments studying radiation particles for NASA missions, including the Juno and Van Allen Probes.  The following year, Koch completed tours of Palmer Station in Antarctica and multiple winter seasons at Summit Station in Greenland. In 2012, she worked at the National Oceanic and Atmospheric Administration  (NOAA) in two capacities: first as a Field Engineer at NOAA's Global Monitoring Division Baseline Observatory in Barrow Alaska (now Utqiaġvik), and then as Station Chief of the American Samoa Observatory.

Astronaut career 
Koch graduated from the NASA Academy program at GSFC in 2001. She worked as an Electrical Engineer in the Laboratory for High Energy Astrophysics at GSFC from 2002 to 2004.

In June 2013, Koch was selected by NASA as part of Astronaut Group 21. She completed training in July 2015, making her available for future missions. Her Astronaut Candidate Training included scientific and technical briefings, intensive instruction in International Space Station systems, spacewalks, robotics, physiological training, T‐38 flight training, and water and wilderness survival training.
On March 14, 2019, Koch launched to the International Space Station on Soyuz MS-12, alongside Aleksey Ovchinin and Nick Hague, to join the Expedition 59/60/61 crew.

Koch was scheduled to perform her first EVA on March 29; this would have been the first all-female spacewalk alongside Anne McClain, but spacesuit sizing issues resulted in it being reassigned from McClain to Hague. Koch performed the first all-female spacewalk with Jessica Meir on October 18, as part of a lengthy series of upgrades to the ISS' power systems and physics observatories.  Koch and Meir followed the historic walk with two more female team walks in January 2020.

On April 17, 2019, due to reassignment schedules with the Commercial Crew Development program, Koch's mission was extended to February 2020. She returned to Earth on February 6 after 328 days – the longest single continuous stay in space for a woman, exceeding Peggy Whitson's 289 days. In addition, for a first-time astronaut, this NASA mission change has never happened before.  Koch's extended mission is being used to study the physical, biological, and mental effects of long-term space travel on women.

Koch was selected as one of the crew members for NASA's upcoming Artemis program, slated for 2025.

Personal life
Koch resides in Texas with her husband, Robert Koch. She enjoys backpacking, rock climbing, paddling, sailing, running, yoga, community service, photography, surfing and travel.

Awards and honors 
Koch has won a number of awards during her tenure at NASA and Johns Hopkins, including the NASA Group Achievement Award, NASA Juno Mission Jupiter Energetic Particle Detector Instrument, 2012; Johns Hopkins University Applied Physics Laboratory, Invention of the Year nominee, 2009; United States Congress Antarctic Service Medal with Winter‐Over distinction, 2005; NASA Group Achievement Award, NASA Suzaku Mission X‐ray Spectrometer Instrument, 2005; Astronaut Scholar, Astronaut Scholarship Foundation, 2000 to 2001.

In December 2020, Koch was awarded an honorary Doctor of Sciences degree from her alma mater, North Carolina State University.

References

External links

 
 
 5 Things You Didn't Know About Astronaut Christina Koch – NASA Johnson Space Center, March 13, 2019
 NASA biography
 Christina Hammock Koch facts

1979 births
American astronauts
American engineers
Johns Hopkins University people
Living people
National Oceanic and Atmospheric Administration personnel
North Carolina School of Science and Mathematics alumni
North Carolina State University alumni
People from Grand Rapids, Michigan
People from Jacksonville, North Carolina
Women astronauts
Spacewalkers